Witney railway station served the Oxfordshire town of Witney on the Oxford, Witney and Fairford Railway line. It consisted of two stone-built platforms, a station building, a signal box, and a shed in the form of a pagoda.

History
The first station in Witney was opened on 14 November 1861 as the terminus of the Witney Railway. Left on a short spur line, the old terminus was closed to passenger traffic, but remained in use as a goods station.

The new station was a joint station for both the Witney Railway and East Gloucestershire Railway until the pair were taken over by the Great Western Railway in 1890. It was provided with two platforms, a booking office and a waiting room; a small signal box was situated on the Up side. Unlike the timber structure at Witney's first station, the main station building was built of Cotswold stone. Adjacent to the station building was a gentlemen's toilet and the signal box, and beyond a characteristic corrugated iron pagoda shed. Between the signal box and the station building there was also a small wooden office for the stationmaster but this was hidden by the bushes and shrubs of the station gardens. The only structure on the Down platform was a basic wooden shelter. As Witney was the principal intermediate station on the line, water columns were provided on both platforms. Beyond the bridge carrying Station Road over the line, which was at the western end of the station, was a loading dock. In the third week of January 1940, King George VI arrived at the station on the Royal Train to inspect troops stationed in the Witney area.

In 1957, it handled 44,000 tons of goods and 66,000 parcels which helped maintain the line in operation during the years prior to its closure. However, only 7,000 passengers were booked during the same period. In the early 1960s, with the gradual transfer of traffic to road and the decline of key industries which had used the railway, the line was unable to justify its existence on the basis of passenger receipts alone. On 18 June 1962, the East Gloucestershire Railway was closed throughout and Witney station closed to passengers. The track on the former East Gloucestershire line was lifted to a point to the east of the Emma's Dyke bridge, which provided an adequate headshunt for the nearby loading dock.

Full closure of the station followed in  together with the redundancy of 13 railway workers. The track through the station was lifted in Winter 1968 and the station building was demolished in January 1969. The first Witney station closed to goods on 2 November 1970, the same day on which the line was closed throughout.

Present day and future
After remaining derelict for over a decade, the site was redeveloped as an industrial estate.

The station has been proposed for reopening, mainly on a site to the south of the town with a potential park and ride scheme, as part of a wider  project to restore the railway to Carterton via Witney and Eynsham.

References

Notes

Sources

External links

 Photos and details of the station
 Station on 1947 OS Map
Archived page with post-closure details of stations

Former Great Western Railway stations
Disused railway stations in Oxfordshire
Railway stations in Great Britain opened in 1873
Railway stations in Great Britain closed in 1962
Witney